A number of nations have had a Ninth Army:

Germany
 9th Army (German Empire), a World War I field Army
 9th Army (Wehrmacht), a World War II field army

Russia  
 9th Army (Russian Empire), a World War I field Army
 9th Army (RSFSR), a Red Army during the Russian Civil War
 9th Army (Soviet Union), of the Soviet Union's Red Army was a Soviet field army, active from 1939 – 43, and then after the war from 1966 to 1989

Others
 Ninth Army (United Kingdom), a formation of the British Army during World War II
 Ninth Army (France), a field army of the French Army during World War I and World War II
 Ninth Army (Ottoman Empire), one of the field armies of the Ottoman Army formed during World War I
 Ninth United States Army, one of the main U.S. Army combat commands used during the campaign in Northwest Europe in 1944 and 1945.